The 1988 WFA Cup Final was the 18th final of the WFA Cup, England's primary cup competition for women's football teams. The showpiece event was played under the auspices of the Women's Football Association (WFA)

Match

Doncaster ended up winning the game 3-1.

References

External links
 
 Report at WomensFACup.co.uk

FA
Women's FA Cup finals
Doncaster Rovers Belles L.F.C. matches 
Everton F.C. (women) matches
May 1988 sports events in the United Kingdom